Ettiene Smit (born 15 June 1974) is a South African strongman competitor and entrant to the World's Strongest Man competition.

Biography
Etienne Smith was born in Johannesburg. He started his strength athletics career at the age of 26 and within five years had become crowned South Africa's strongest man. From 2004 to 2009 he did not relinquish this title winning a record six times in a row. He has stated that his international presence in strength athletics has been curtailed by financial difficulties, although he was able to take up an invitation to the prestigious World's Strongest Man in both 2009 and 2010. Aside from strength athletics, he owns a restaurant in Pretoria, South Africa.

Strongman competition record
 2001
 3. - South Africa's Strongest Man
 2002
 4. - South Africa's Strongest Man
 2003
 2. - South Africa's Strongest Man
 2004
 1. - South Africa's Strongest Man
 2005
 1. - South Africa's Strongest Man
 3. - IFSA Hungary GP
 6. - Champions Trophy Holland
 2006
 1. - South Africa's Strongest Man
 2007
 1. - South Africa's Strongest Man
 2008
 1. - South Africa's Strongest Man
 2009
 1. - South Africa's Strongest Man

References

External links
 Ettiene Smit - official site

1974 births
Living people
South African strength athletes